Marie Kremer (born 15 April 1982 in Uccle) is a Belgian actress. Her first leading role was in the 2003 movie I Always Wanted to be a Saint (J'ai toujours voulu être une sainte)., for which she won the Créteil International Women's Film Festival's Female Talent Award. After that, she played in St.Jacques-La Mecque, a film about a group of people on their way to Santiago de Compostela. She is also to be seen in Caché (directed by Michael Haneke, well-known from his movie "Funny Games"), and also in  Ravages, a film from Christophe Lamotte, Blame it on Fidel and Beneath the rooftops of Paris. In 2012 she was nominated for the Magritte Award for Best Supporting Actress.

Kremer is a native speaker of French. She also speaks fluent English and Dutch, as well as some Spanish and Italian.

From 2009-17, she was a cast member of Un village français.

She starred in six episodes of Profilage as Louise Drancourt - young and beautiful nurse, engaged and preparing to be a stepmother. She is stalking Chloe and later tells her that the two of them are daughters of a same father. This, however, turns out to be a lie; Louise was working as a nurse in the center where Chloe's father was locked. She had been listening his stories about Chloe and became obsessed with her. She wanted to be the only person that Chloe cares about. At Louise's wedding, Chloe began to realize that and Mathieu tried to arrest Louise, who stabbed him in the neck.
Two seasons later we find out that Louise did not went to jail but to hospital, insisting that she was ill and not responsible for her actions. She made one of her doctors kill himself blaming Chloe. Then Louise was taken by Adelle, who wanted her to admit what she did in order to prove that Chloe was innocent. Instead, Louise charmed Adele, almost making her take her side. But when Louise tried to kill Chloe's daughter, she was arrested with Adele's help and this is the last time we see Marie Kremer's character.

Filmography

Film
2003: J'ai toujours voulu être une sainte: Norah
2005: Saint-Jacques… La Mecque: Camille
2005: Caché: Jeannette
2005: Le Couperet: Judy Rick
2006: Charell: hotel maid
2006: Quand j'étais chanteur
2006: Dikkenek: Fabienne
2006: Mon fils à moi: Suzanne
2006: Mon colonel : Thérèse
2006: La Faute à Fidel!: Isabelle
2006: Les Ambitieux: Marie
2007: Michou d'Auber: stationery seller
2007: Les Toits de Paris: Julie
2007: Survivre avec les loups: Janine
2008: Bientôt j'arrête: Chanel
2009: Soeur Sourire: Françoise
2009: Le Bel Âge (or L'Insurgée): Marie
2011: Holidays by the Sea

Television
2003: Péril imminent, TV film: Clémentine Ercourt
2007: Chez Maupassant, TV series, episode Histoire d'une fille de ferme: Rose Janvier
2007: Ravages, TV film: Florence
2009: Mac Orlan, TV series, episode Jusqu'au bout du monde: Cyrielle
2009: Contes et nouvelles du XIXe siècle, TV series, episode Le bonheur dans le crime: Claire Stassin
2009–2017: Un village français, TV series: Lucienne Borderie
2010: Les Vivants et les Morts, TV series
2010: Profilage, TV series: Louise
2017: Transferts, TV series: Oriane Mareuil

Awards
Créteil International Women's Film Festival 2004 : Prix du talent féminin, for J'ai toujours voulu être une sainte

References

External links

1982 births
Living people
People from Uccle
Belgian film actresses
21st-century Belgian actresses